Haji Md Jais bin Haji Sarday is a Malaysian politician. He was the Johor State Legislative Assembly member for the constituency of Mahkota in Johor from 2008 until 2018. He is a member of United Malay National Organisation (UMNO), a major component party in the Barisan Nasional (BN) coalition.

Election results

Honours

Honours of Malaysia 
  :
  Officer of the Order of the Defender of the Realm (KMN) (2015)
 Commander of the Order of Meritorious Service (PJN) - Datuk (2016)

References 

Living people
People from Johor
Malaysian people of Malay descent
Malaysian Muslims
United Malays National Organisation politicians
21st-century Malaysian politicians
Year of birth missing (living people)
Members of the Johor State Legislative Assembly
Johor state executive councillors
Commanders of the Order of Meritorious Service
Officers of the Order of the Defender of the Realm